Cielo De Tambores is the tenth album by Colombian salsa band Grupo Niche released on December 20, 1990.The album became the most successful record production of the group from Cali, driven by compositions that achieved wide airplay in their country and in the rest of Latin America such as Una Aventura, Cali Ají, Busca Por Dentro and Sin Sentimiento. The same year of its release, it ranked third on Billboard magazine's tropical music chart in the United States.

Recordings and Composition 
With the acquisition of his own recording studio, Jairo begins to be more of a perfectionist and finishes recording several days even until 8 a.m. in the morning. Here is the history of some topics:

Cali Aji 
One of the most complicated songs to perform, since Jairo Varela did not like any of the choirs that were recorded, so he repeated it over and over again. In the early hours of the morning, one of the musicians asks the recording studio guard to buy pandebono and oatmeal. In the middle of the recess conversation, Jairo exclaims "... I was getting hungry, and the thing is that the pod is a matter of pandebono", which served as inspiration for the chorus of the theme.

Track listing 
Credits adapted from the liner notes of Cielo de Tambores.

Credits 
Bass: Raúl Umaña, Johnny Torres (special collaboration)

Bongo: Ivan Sierra

Singers: Charlie Cardona, Javier Vásquez, Ricardo "Richie" Valdés

Congas: Denny's Ibarguen

Choirs: Ricardo "Richie" Valdés, Charlie Cardona, Javier Vásquez, Raúl Umaña, Jairo Varela

Maracas: Diego Galé (special collaboration)

Piano: Álvaro "Fluff" Cabarcas

Keyboard: Ricardo "Richie" Valdes

Timpani: William Valdes

Trombone 1: Cesar Monges

Trombone 2: Gonzalo Palacio

Trombone 3: Andrés Viáfara

Trumpet 1: Danny Jimenez

Trumpet 2: Oswaldo Ospino

Producers 
Arrangements and direction in studies: Jairo Varela, Andrés Viáfara 

Arrangements: Sergio George (special collaboration on "Sin Sentimiento" and "Se Pareció Tanto a Ti")

Charts

Sales

References 

Grupo Niche albums
1990 albums
Sony Discos albums
Sony Music Colombia albums
Sony Music albums